Nikolay Antonov (born 17 August 1968 in Razgrad) is a retired Bulgarian athlete. He started as a 200 metres sprinter, and won the 1991 World Indoor Championships and 1992 European Athletics Indoor Championships. In 1993 he switched to long jump.

His personal best time was 20.20 seconds, achieved at the 1991 World Championships earned him the title "the fastest white man on the planet". It is also the Bulgarian record. Antonov defeated Carl Lewis in the 200 metres in March 1992 at an indoor meet in San Sebastian, Spain. He was timed in 20.51, Lewis in 20.75.

His personal best long jump was 8.21 metres, achieved in July 1994 in Plovdiv. This ranks him fifth among Bulgarian long jumpers, behind Ivaylo Mladenov, Atanas Atanasov, Nikolay Atanasov and Petar Dachev.

International competitions

See also
List of World Athletics Indoor Championships medalists (men)
List of European Athletics Indoor Championships medalists (men)
List of Balkan Athletics Championships winners (men)
List of Bulgarian Athletics Championships winners

References 

1968 births
Living people
People from Razgrad
Bulgarian male sprinters
Bulgarian male long jumpers
Olympic male sprinters
Olympic athletes of Bulgaria
Athletes (track and field) at the 1992 Summer Olympics
World Athletics Championships athletes for Bulgaria
World Athletics Indoor Championships winners
Bulgarian Athletics Championships winners